Keith Olbermann occasionally delivered "special comments", commentaries usually several minutes long and often directed at a political figure, on his 2003-2011 MSNBC news show, Countdown with Keith Olbermann. The first commentary specifically designated as a special comment was delivered on August 30, 2006. He continued this practice when Countdown transferred to Current TV for the 2011-2012 season.

Olbermann originated and wrote his special comments himself, which he described as a two-day process that began with "[getting] pissed off" and involved a number of rewrites and rehearsals before the show aired. Olbermann delivered a total of 57 Special Comments on MSNBC's Countdown.  The special comments almost always took the form of criticism of the conservatives, including the Bush administration, Newt Gingrich or Tom DeLay.

He also criticized the Democratic Party and President Barack Obama when they seemed to be catering to the whims of the right wing. His criticism of Hillary Clinton's response to the comments of Geraldine Ferraro about Barack Obama and the comments aftermath was the first time a special comment was "directed exclusively at a Democrat."

Some of his most vehement Special Comments were about the need for universal health care in the United States. He appealed to viewers several times to support the National Association of Free Clinics. On October 6, 2009, Olbermann delivered a one-hour Special Comment devoted entirely to the need for health care reform, detailing history, statistics, and a personal account about what he witnessed while caring for his ailing father.

Olbermann's special comments generated much attention and controversy, especially on the Internet. They have been viewed hundreds of thousands of times on YouTube. The day after the first special comment, Olbermann's name became the #4 search term on Technorati and the Amazon.com ranking of his book Worst Person in the World jumped from #98 to #19. On at least two instances, excerpts from special comments were entered into the Congressional Record, including a speech by West Virginia Representative Nick Rahall on the House floor.

A book compiling Olbermann's Special Comments, Truth and Consequences: Special Comments on the Bush Administration's War on American Values, was released on December 26, 2007, containing all the Special Comments that aired on or before September 4, 2007, including the one on Hurricane Katrina.

Countdown ended in 2012 and Olbermann moved into sports broadcasting for a time. In 2016, he launched The Resistance with Keith Olbermann, a political commentary web series for GQ magazine built around discussions similar to the earlier "special comments."

Origins and parodies 
Before Olbermann started designating his commentaries "special comments," he delivered a commentary on what he characterized as the Bush administration's incompetence in handling the Hurricane Katrina relief effort on September 5, 2005. The commentary was widely shared on the Internet and prompted Rolling Stone to name Olbermann a "truth teller" in its 2005 Men of the Year issue.

On December 18, 2006, MSNBC first aired a show dedicated entirely to Olbermann's special comments. The show, which aired during Countdown's normal time slot during Countdown's holiday hiatus featured four Special Comments: "This hole in the ground", "Feeling morally, intellectually confused?", "A special comment about lying", and "Where are the checks, balances?" Olbermann revealed during this show that his first special comment, "Feeling morally, intellectually confused?" was written on the back of a travel itinerary while waiting for a flight in Los Angeles.  Later, on August 31, 2007, Olbermann spoofed himself and the special comments with a guest appearance on The Soup. In it, he and host Joel McHale berated Britney Spears and Lindsay Lohan for their misbehavior, going so far as to put up a photo of Anna Nicole Smith as an example of what could happen to them if they don't change their ways.   Olbermann similarly parodied the concept (and his own delivery) during the Keeping Tabs segment of the December 7, 2007 edition of Countdown with a "Special Come On." It was directed at FOX Network executives about the possibility of an Arrested Development movie, and extolled the virtues of the show both in terms of quality and marketability.

In 2008, Saturday Night Live guest host Ben Affleck portrayed Olbermann in a parody of Countdown, which featured a mock special comment against the co-op board that would not allow Olbermann to keep his cat, satirically named "Miss Precious Perfect", in an apartment he shares with his mother. Ironically, Olbermann is allergic to cats.

In January 2010, The Daily Show also parodied the special comment format, with host Jon Stewart criticising Olbermann for 'name-calling' in his attacks on Scott Brown.

The October 2010 issue of Mad Magazine included "The Wizard of O," a contemporary parody of The Wizard of Oz written by Desmond Devlin and illustrated by Tom Richmond, in which the film's roles were filled by Barack Obama, Sarah Palin and dozens of cable news pundits. As the Scarecrow, Bill O'Reilly squabbles with his rival Olbermann as the Tin Man, including the taunt, "'Special' Comment? Give me a break! How special can they be, when you do one every night?"

List of special comments
The links in this table are to transcripts or videos of the special comments. Special comment titles and summaries are those on the MSNBC website; Olbermann does not mention them on air.

Campaign comments
In October 2008, two weeks before the presidential election, Olbermann announced that he would briefly transform his special comments into a nightly feature, claiming that "If [the McCain campaign is] going to pile it on for the next two weeks, I'm going to have to throw it back."  After numerous people observed that daily comments would render the term "special" meaningless, Olbermann christened the two weeks' comments as campaign comments.  He also noted that the campaign comments would be less formal than his special comments, and "not necessarily just monologues, either.  Sound Bites now acceptable."

Quick comments
Besides his special comments, Olbermann has, since January 11, 2010, also used "Quick Comments" to discuss news stories. It is usually reserved for topics which are not as impactful on American life as those which are covered in his Special Comments, but it is often used to bring attention to natural disaster crises around the country.

Tea Time
Beginning on April 20, 2010, Olbermann devoted many of his Quick Comment segments to the Tea Party movement, which he begins with the sound of a whistling kettle on the boil and the following:

No, that is not your water coming to a boil. That's our nightly checkup on the something-for-nothing crowd. 'It's Tea Time!'

Special Comments On Current TV

June 15, 2011: Embarrassing Behavior over Weiner Roasting concerning the investigation of a sex scandal involving former Congressman Anthony Weiner.

June 23, 2011: A Clear Case for Same-Sex Marriage

August 2, 2011: Four Great Hypocrisies of the Debt Deal

September 2011 Baseball and the Anniversary of 9/11

October 2011 Calls for Oakland Mayor to quit.

March 2012 Fired by Current TV

References

External links 
 Official MSNBC Webpage for Keith Olbermann's special comments
 Official blog of Keith Olbermann (When Comment has been broadcast, Olbermann posts his summary of it)

Olbermann, Keith special comments
Olbermann, Keith special comments
Keith Olbermann's special comments
Keith Olbermann's special comments
Keith Olbermann's special comments
Keith Olbermann's special comments